Pleasantdale and Pleasant Dale can refer to:

Rural Municipality of Pleasantdale No. 398, Saskatchewan, Canada
Pleasantdale, Saskatchewan

United States
Pleasant Dale, Nebraska
Pleasantdale, New Jersey
Pleasant Dale, West Virginia
Pleasantdale, Wyoming